Willis is an unincorporated community in Calhoun County, Florida, United States.  It is located on State Road 73.

Geography
Willis is located at  (30.5531, -85.1867).

References

Unincorporated communities in Calhoun County, Florida
Unincorporated communities in Florida